Andrew P. Koenig (born December 21, 1982) is an American politician who has served in the Missouri Senate since 2017. Koenig, a Republican, is a former member of the Missouri House of Representatives and a small business owner. From 2009 to 2012, he represented the 88th district of Missouri. Koenig was elected to serve as the State Senator from the 15th district in 2017 and re-elected in 2020.

Personal life
Koenig graduated from Marquette High School, which is in Chesterfield, in 2001.  He later went to Lindenwood University with a scholarship in cross country.  He majored in Business Administration and minored in philosophy.

He has co-owned a paint company with his father since 1997.  He is also the owner of a construction company which focuses on roofing and painting. In addition, he is a licensed insurance adjuster.

Political career
In 2008, after winning his primary, Koenig ran unopposed to represent the 88th district in the Missouri House of Representatives.  In his 2010 reelection campaign, he again won his primary and ran opposed in the general election. In 2010, he was one of 35 state representatives to sign a "no new taxes" pledge.  In both 2012 and 2014, Koenig maintained his seat by defeating Democrat William Pinkston in the general election. In 2016, he was elected as State Senator from the 15th District, defeating Democrat Stephen Eagleton in the general election 61.1% to 38.9%.

Committee assignments
Health and Pensions (Vice-Chairman)
Judiciary and Civil and Criminal Jurisprudence
Seniors, Families and Children
Small Business and Industry
Ways and Means (Chairman)
Joint Committee on Child Abuse and Neglect
Joint Committee on Education
Joint Committee on Public Employee Retirement (Vice-Chairman)
Joint Committee on Tax Policy

Abortion restrictions
As a state senator, Koenig has sponsored or co-sponsored a bills to restrict legal abortions, including 7 in the 2019 session. Koenig is opposed to exceptions for rape or incest. Koenig sponsored "heartbeat bills", which ban early-term abortion. He sponsored a blanket ban on abortions after 8 weeks, which additionally would prohibit abortion sought solely because of the sex, race, or Down syndrome diagnosis of the fetus.  In the 2019 session, Koenig was responsible for handling the passage of HB 126 in the State Senate, a bill banning abortions after 8 weeks in all cases except medical emergency, with penalties of 5–15 years in prison.

Promotion of creationism in schools
As a representative, Koenig made several legislative attempts to add the pseudoscientific arguments of creationism and intelligent design to the public school science curricula, specifically in the fields of biology and chemistry. 

In 2015, Koenig sponsored a bill, HB486, that proposed allowing teachers the freedom to introduce "differences of opinion about controversial issues, including biological and chemical evolution." The bill did not pass committee.

According to the National Center for Science Education, Koenig was also the sponsor of similar bills: HB195 in 2011, HB1276 in 2012, HB179 in 2013, and HB1587 in 2014. All of those bills failed. He cosponsored HB1227 in 2012 and HB291 in 2013, which would require public schools, including introductory courses at colleges and universities, to teach intelligent design in equal measure to evolution; both failed. Koenig also cosponsored HB1472 in 2013, which would require schools to notify parents if they had "instruction relating to the theory of evolution by natural selection".

Electoral history

State Senate

State Representative

References

External links
 Official Missouri House of Representatives profile
 Interest Group Ratings
 Campaign Finance Information

1982 births
21st-century American politicians
Lindenwood University alumni
Living people
Republican Party Missouri state senators
Republican Party members of the Missouri House of Representatives
Politicians from St. Louis